Antelope Creek is a stream in the U.S. state of South Dakota.

Antelope Creek was named for the antelope native to the area.

See also
List of rivers of South Dakota

References

Rivers of Harding County, South Dakota
Rivers of South Dakota